Zagorica is a small settlement in the Municipality of Mirna in southeastern Slovenia. It lies in the hills west of Mirna. The municipality is included in the Southeast Slovenia Statistical Region. The entire area is part of the traditional region of Lower Carniola.

Notable people
Notable people that were born or lived in Zagorica include:
 (born 1926), cultural worker

References

External links
Zagorica on Geopedia

Populated places in the Municipality of Mirna